is a private university in Hiroshima, Hiroshima, Japan. 

The predecessor of the school, Hiroshima Domain's Han school, was founded in 1725. It was chartered as a junior college in 1952 and became a four-year college in 1960. The school adopted the present name in 1973. It was announced in March 2013 that Shudo Gakuen, the educational corporation behind the university, would merge in April 2015 with Suzugamine Gakuen, the educational corporation behind Suzugamine Women's College.

References

External links
 Official website 

Educational institutions established in 1725
Private universities and colleges in Japan
Universities and colleges in Hiroshima Prefecture
1725 establishments in Japan